Erica Wheeler may refer to:

 Erica Wheeler (singer-songwriter), American folk singer-songwriter
 Erica Wheeler (athlete) (born 1967), American athlete in javelin throw 
 Erica Wheeler (basketball) (born 1991), American basketball player